Imnadia is a genus of conchostracans found only in Europe. It has occasionally been placed in a monotypic family, "Imnadiidae", but is more usually placed in the Limnadiidae. It contains the following species:
Imnadia cristata Marinček, 1972 – near Bočar, Serbia
Imnadia voitestii Botnariuc & Orghidan, 1941 – Romania
Imnadia banatica Marinček & Valvajter, 1982 – near Novi Kneževac, Serbia
Imnadia panonica Marinček & Petrov, 1984 – near Kikinda, Serbia
Imnadia yeyetta Hertzog, 1935 – France

References

Branchiopoda genera
Spinicaudata
Taxonomy articles created by Polbot